Örebro SK Bandy is the Bandy section of sports club Örebro SK, from Örebro, Sweden.  Örebro were founded in 1908 and play their home games indoors at Behrn Arena.  The club play in Allsvenskan, the second highest division of Swedish bandy.

History
In the first year of bandy league system in Sweden, 1930–31, Örebro entered in Division 1 Södra together with
Djurgårdens IF, IF Göta, IFK Strängnäs, IFK Uppsala, IK Göta, Linköpings AIK, and Nässjö IF and finished 3rd.

Honours

Domestic
 Swedish Champions:
 Winners (5): 1955, 1957, 1958, 1965, 1967
 Runners-up (5): 1951, 1954, 1956, 1968, 1973

References

External links
 
 Supporters club website
 bandysidan

 
Bandy clubs in Sweden
Sport in Örebro
Bandy clubs established in 1908
1908 establishments in Sweden